The Falkland Island General Employees Union is a trade union representing workers in the Falkland Islands.  Originally founded in 1943 as the Falkland Islands Labour Federation, the union mostly represents workers in the agriculture sector.

The Falkland Islands Weekly News in 1944 carried an article on the union:

A number of former leaders and members of the FIGEU have been elected to the Island's General Assembly:

 Terrence S. Betts 1987 by-election for Stanley (constituency).
 Gavin Short elected 1989; 2009 & 2013 for Stanley (constituency).
 Frederick John Cheek elected 1964 for Stanley (constituency).
 Richard Victor Goss elected 1960; 1964 & 1968 for Stanley (constituency). 

.

References 

Organisations based in the Falkland Islands
Trade unions in South America
Trade unions in British Overseas Territories
Trade unions established in 1943